Pseudoalteromonas nigrifaciens is a marine bacterium. It has been observed to cause skin ulcer syndrome in juvenile cultivated sea cucumbers.

References

External links
Type strain of Pseudoalteromonas nigrifaciens at BacDive -  the Bacterial Diversity Metadatabase

Alteromonadales